Devasundari is a 1962 Indian Kannada-language film, directed by C. V. Raju and produced by M. H. M. Munas. The film stars Rajkumar, B. Saroja Devi, Kalyan Kumar and Narasimharaju. The film has musical score by C. N. Panduranga. The dialogues were written by T. N. Balakrishna who also wrote 16 songs in the movie one of which was sung by Dr. Rajkumar which was picturized on Narasimharaju - the first instance where Rajkumar's voice was used for a song not picturized on him.

Cast
Rajkumar as Gandharva Shankhapala
B. Saroja Devi as Devasundari
Kalyan Kumar as Veera Pratapa
Narasimharaju

Music
"Kavi Battethottavarella" - Dr. Rajkumar, Sarojini

References

External links
 

1962 films
1960s Kannada-language films
Films scored by C. N. Pandurangan